Rear Admiral Charles Davis Lucas VC (19 February 1834 – 7 August 1914) was born in Ireland and was the first person to win the Victoria Cross. An officer of the Royal Navy, he performed the earliest actions to be recognised with the Victoria Cross, the highest award for gallantry in the face of the enemy that can be awarded to British and Commonwealth forces. He rose to the rank of rear admiral during his time in the navy.

Details

Lucas was born in Druminargal House, Poyntzpass, County Armagh, on 19 February 1834. He enlisted in the Royal Navy in 1848 at age 13, served aboard , and saw action in the Second Anglo-Burmese War of 1852–53 aboard the frigate Fox at Rangoon, Pegu, and Dalla. By age 20, he had become a mate.

During the Battle of Bomarsund of the Crimean War, he was awarded the Victoria Cross for the following deed:

On 21 June 1854 in the Baltic, with two other ships, was bombarding Bomarsund, a fort in Åland off Finland. The fire was returned from the fort, and at the height of the action a live shell landed on Hecla upper deck, with its fuse still hissing. All hands were ordered to fling themselves flat on the deck, but Lucas with great presence of mind ran forward and hurled the shell into the sea, where it exploded with a tremendous roar before it hit the water. Thanks to Lucas's action no one on board was killed or seriously wounded by the shell, and accordingly he was immediately promoted to lieutenant by his commanding officer.

Later life
His act of bravery in Hecla was the first to be rewarded with the Victoria Cross. He was promoted to commander in 1862 and commanded the experimental armoured gunboat  in 1867. He was promoted to captain in 1867, before retiring on 1 October 1873. He was later promoted to rear-admiral on the retired list in 1885. During his career he received the India General Service Medal with the bar Pegu 1852, the Baltic Medal 1854–55, and the Royal Humane Society Lifesaving Medal.

In 1879 he married Frances Russell Hall, daughter of Admiral William Hutcheon Hall, who had been captain of Hecla in 1854. The couple had three daughters together. Lucas served for a time as Justice of the Peace for both Kent and Argyllshire, and died in Great Culverden, Kent on 7 August 1914. He is buried at St Lawrence's Church Mereworth, Maidstone, Kent.

Medals
Lucas's campaign medals, including his Victoria Cross, are displayed at the National Maritime Museum in Greenwich, London.  They are not the original medals, which were left on a train and never recovered. Replacement copies were made, though the reverse of the Victoria Cross copy is uninscribed.

Notes

References

Citations

Sources
Listed in order of publication year 
The Register of the Victoria Cross  (1981, 1988 and 1997)
Clarke, Brian  (1986). The Irish Sword
Ross, Graham (1995). Scotland's Forgotten Valour

External links
Location of grave and VC medal (Kent)
The Bomarsund memorial

1834 births
1914 deaths
People from County Armagh
Crimean War recipients of the Victoria Cross
British military personnel of the Second Anglo-Burmese War
Royal Navy personnel of the Crimean War
Irish recipients of the Victoria Cross
British recipients of the Victoria Cross
Royal Navy rear admirals
Royal Navy recipients of the Victoria Cross
Military personnel from County Armagh
Burials in Kent